Encephalartos aemulans, the Ngotshe cycad, is a species of cycad endemic to South Africa. It is listed by the IUCN as Critically Endangered and by CITES in Appendix I. Only 100-250 are believed to be left, with a decreasing population trend. Its main threat is collecting of wild specimens.

Description
These plants have an erect stem, without branches, which can reach 3 m in height and 35 cm in diameter.

The leaves, up to 2 m long, are composed of lanceolate leaflets, with margins endowed with small spines, 12–15 cm long and arranged on the rachis in the opposite way to 135°.

It is a dioecious species, endowed with ovoid male cones, sessile, yellow in color, 29–38 cm long and 14–18 cm broad, with broad and rhombic microsporophylls. The female cones have a yellow-green color, are 35–40 cm long and 20–23 cm broad, with macrosporophylls with a warty surface.

The seeds have an oblong shape, are 25–30 mm long and are covered with a red flesh.

Distribution and habitat
The species is endemic to KwaZulu-Natal in South Africa, were a single population is known. It occurs among sandstone cliffs in shortgrass savannah at altitudes of 1,000-1,100 m, with individual specimens found at lower altitudes.

References

aemulans